Ernest Bošnjak (Zombor, Austria-Hungary 2 January 1876 – Sombor, Yugoslavia 9 August 1963) was a Yugoslavian cameraman, film director and printer. One of the founders of the filmography in Vojvodina.

References

External links

Hungarians in Vojvodina
1876 births
1963 deaths
People from Sombor
Yugoslav film directors